Martina Rosucci (born 9 May 1992) is an Italian professional footballer who plays as a midfielder for Serie A club Juventus FC and the Italy women's national team.

Club career
Rosucci played for Torino before moving to Brescia in 2011. She joined Juventus in 2017.

International career
Rosucci was called up by manager Antonio Cabrini to be part of the Italy women's national football team for the UEFA Women's Euro 2013. She was also included in Italy's squad for the UEFA Women's Euro 2017.

Honours
Brescia
 Serie A: 2013–14, 2015–16
 Coppa Italia: 2011–12, 2014–15, 2015–16
 Italian Women's Super Cup: 2014, 2015, 2016

Juventus
 Serie A: 2017–18, 2018–19, 2019–20, 2020–21, 2021–22
 Coppa Italia: 2018–19, 
 Supercoppa Italiana: 2019, 2020–21, 2021–22

Italy U19
 UEFA Women's Under-19 Championship: 2008

Individual
 Pallone Azzurro: 2014

References

External links

 Martina Rosucci at US Soccerway
 
 
 Profile at soccerdonna.de 

1992 births
Living people
Italian women's footballers
Italy women's international footballers
Footballers from Turin
Women's association football midfielders
Serie A (women's football) players
A.C.F. Brescia Calcio Femminile players
Juventus F.C. (women) players
2019 FIFA Women's World Cup players
Torino Women A.S.D. players
UEFA Women's Euro 2022 players
UEFA Women's Euro 2017 players
21st-century Italian women